Hans-Joachim Jabs (14 November 1917 – 26 October 2003) was an officer in the German Luftwaffe during World War II. Jabs was the rare case of a pilot who found success in two distinctly different forms of aerial combat. He was one of the few pilots to obtain Experte while flying a heavy daytime fighter. Surviving the Battle of Britain, he later became one of most successful pilots in the night fighter force. The skill sets for the two operations were completely different. Through 510 combat missions he was credited with 50 victories, 31 of them achieved at night. Following the war he became a successful businessman in the field of heavy agricultural equipment.

Early life and training
Jabs was born 14 November 1917 in the city of Lübeck, Germany. He was the son of a Oberinspektor (Chief Inspector). After graduation from school and receipt of his Abitur (university entry qualification) in 1936 from the "Johanneum" in Lübeck, he completed his compulsory Reich Labour Service. At the age of 19, he began his military career in the Luftwaffe as a Fahnenjunker (non-commissioned officer) on 4 December 1936.

After completing his training as a pilot at the Luftwaffe school at Wildpark-Werder, he served briefly as a bomber pilot for I. Gruppe of Kampfgeschwader 253 (I./KG 253). He served with KG 253 for two months, and then went to special training for fighter pilots. In July 1938 he completed the conversion course to fighters, and on 1 November 1938 was posted as a 1st Lieutenant and Adjutant for I. Gruppe of JG 144, flying the Messerschmitt Bf 109D. This unit was re-equipped with what was the new long range heavy fighter Messerschmitt Bf 110 and redesignated II. Gruppe of Zerstörergeschwader 76 (ZG 76—76th Destroyer Wing).

At the outset of the war no one knew with certainty how air battles in a coming conflict would be fought. The speeds of the aircraft had more than doubled since the Great War, leading many to believe that dog-fighting was a thing of the past. Most thought air combat would be a battle between bombers attacking territory and fighters defending, and that the bomber would be the key offensive weapon. Most conceded the fighters would be unable to stop the bombers. With that in mind, the Bf 110 heavy fighter had been produced. It was fast, had long range and a heavy armament.

Jabs flew the heavy fighter for all six years of the war, with Erich Weißflog serving as his radio operator, and later radar operator. In March 1940 Jabs was promoted to lieutenant. He was with ZG 76 when the Second World War began with the invasion of Poland in September 1939.

Battle of France

As a member of II./ZG 76, Jabs operated over France and the low countries during the blitzkrieg that swept the Netherlands, Belgium and France in the spring of 1940. He was credited with his first victory on 12 May with the destruction of a French Hawk 75A of the Armee de l'air. The following day he shot down a French Morane. Jabs' method with the Bf 110 was to approach from above and dive onto his opponents, using the weight of the aircraft and its heavy forward firing guns to advantage. He declined dogfighting, attempting instead to maintain speed and height, and was conscious of the need to put distance between his aircraft and the opposing fighters when the time came.
Over the next five weeks he was credited with four more, two French aircraft and two RAF Spitfires.
On 15 May Jabs was awarded the Iron Cross 2nd Class, and two weeks later the Iron Cross 1st Class on 28 May.

Battle of Britain
In the summer and fall of 1940 Jabs was engaged in a series of fierce air battles over the Channel and southern England during the Battle of Britain. At the outset of the battle the twin-engined Messerschmitt Bf 110 was expected to engage in air-to-air combat while escorting the Luftwaffe bomber fleet. The plane had proved effective in the Freie Jagd role, where it could attack at speed and regain altitude. The Bf 110 was faster than the Hurricane, and nearly as fast as the Spitfire, but its greater weight limited its ability to accelerate and manoeuver. When Reichsmarschall Hermann Göring insisted the fighters stay with the bombers as a close escort, the Bf 110 was unable to take advantage of its strengths. Subsequently, Bf 110 losses mounted.
Acting as an escort, the ability Jabs possessed as a heavy fighter pilot became well apparent. The Bf 110 was not capable of holding its own against British Hurricanes and Spitfires. Though losses in the heavy fighter units were mounting, Jabs managed to stay alive and still meet with success. Between 15 August and 11 September 1940 he was credited with 11 victories over the channel and southern England, bringing his total to 17.

On 30 August 1940 Staffelkapitän Heinz Nacke was injured in an air combat over England. Jabs was made Staffelkapitän of 6./ZG 76 to replace him. Heavy losses among the heavy fighter units in August and few replacements meant missions flown by Bf 110 units in September decreased, as they no longer had the numbers to fly them. In October the units were withdrawn. In this time Jabs had become one of the top scoring Zestörer pilots, with 17 victories. In recognition of his success Jabs was awarded the Knight's Cross of the Iron Cross on 1 October.

Coastal patrol and the battle of Crete
In October 1940 Jabs' unit was transferred to Stavanger, Norway to perform coastal patrols to protect German shipping. This duty was better suited to the Bf 110, as the aircraft they would most likely face would be Blenheims or Hampdens. In the event his air group was never challenged, and the patrols soon became routine and dull. Jabs and his unit remained in Norway until the spring of the next year.

At the end of April 1941 Jabs and II. Gruppe of Zerstörergeschwader 76 were transferred from the German Bight to the Balkans to support the invasion of Crete. They joined two other Zerstörer groups that were already in theater, I. and II. Gruppe of Zerstörergeschwader 26. The battle over Crete and the surrounding waters began 20 May 1941, and ran until 1 June 1941. At this point of the war the Bf 110 was found most useful in the ground attack role. Jabs led his Staffel over Crete attacking ground targets and Allied shipping. During this time no opportunity presented to Jabs to engage in aerial combat.

An increasing threat of night attacks on the territory of the Third Reich prompted the Luftwaffe high command to strengthen relevant defenses. As a result, by the end of the year, 6./ZG 76 was taken off day operations, transferred to the Netherlands, re-designated 9. Staffel of Nachtjagdgeschwader 3 (NJG 3), and employed in night operations.

The night fighter force

As Bomber Command's nighttime bombing campaign against German industry gathered strength, a night fighter force was developed by Wolfgang Falck and Josef Kammhuber. The force was in need of experienced pilots to lead it against the increasing RAF attacks. In November 1941, after training for two months on night fighter techniques, the now Hauptmann Jabs officially was transferred to the night fighter force, as Staffelkapitän of 9. Staffel of NJG 3. Jabs started operational night sorties in November. Assigned to the station in Hamburg, his group was placed there to defend the harbor and the German Navy's military facilities.

The primary difficulty in night fighting was being able to locate another aircraft in the dark of night. In the British experience, Bomber Command aircraft would fly for hours on raids involving several hundred aircraft, and never see another airplane during the entire mission. If a German night fighter did sight a British bomber, he had to approach without being detected. If seen by the rear gunner the plane would evade, and it was almost impossible to find it again or attack it with any chance of success. Experienced night fighter pilots would move on and look for another target. Frustrated by these difficulties, Jabs did not make a successful attack until seven months later, on the night of the 25/26 June 1942.

Channel Dash

In February 1942 the Kriegsmarine was ordered to move its capital ships from Brest to German waters, to be in a position to intervene in a feared invasion of German occupied Norway. Operation Donnerkeil (Operation Thunderbolt), as the German air-cover plan was named, called for an aircover to be in place before dawn. Jab's gruppe was to place 30 Bf 110 night fighters over the fleet from before dawn till they were relieved by the Fw 190s of JG 2. The German fleet slipped out of Brest after darkness fell on 11 February, and were sailing their way up the channel the following morning. Jabs and his gruppe arrived over the fleet in the night and completed their portion of the mission without incident. With the successful completion of the mission Jabs' unit returned to the Netherlands and the night fighter battle.

Air war over the Netherlands
On 1 November 1942 Jabs was appointed Staffelkapitän of 11./NJG 1, where he would become friends with Helmut Lent, Heinz-Wolfgang Schnaufer, Günther Radusch and Martin Drewes. By the end of the year he had accumulated four victories as a nightfighter. With the addition of FuG 202 Lichtenstein radar Jabs began having greater success locating British bombers. He became adept at the orthodox night fighter attack method of von unten hinten, or from under and behind. This involved locating a weaving bomber and then approaching low and to the rear, hopefully avoiding being sighted by the bomber's rear gunner. When he had closed adequately he would assume a climbing attitude and fire at the bomber's undercarriage.

In January 1943 the Eighth Air Force began taking their daylight operations into Germany. Beyond the range of fighter escort, Bomber Command discouraged the idea, but the Eighth believed their aircraft would be able to fight their way through to the target. The initial raid was against Wilhelmshaven. The first attack on 27 January was conducted with 60 B-17s, and was met by resistance from JG-1. The B-17s brushed the defenses aside and delivered their loads on Wilhelmshaven, while suffering the loss of 3 aircraft. Göring insisted that all aircraft, including the night fighter force, would be put into the air to resist these attacks against Germany.  The second raid 4 February was mounted against the marshaling yards at Hamm. Poor weather was a problem, and the mission was diverted to the industrial area of Emden. JG 1 again responded, but this time they were joined by Jabs and his gruppe. Neither German fighter unit possessed the techniques of attack developed in northern France by JG 2 and JG 26, and had a difficult time engaging the bombers. Official Luftwaffe doctrine was to attack bombers from the rear and above. Against the heavily gunned B-17s, Jabs and his crews knew such attacks were suicidal. Several attacks from the beam were made, and eventually a break in the formation opened a gap which Jabs and his wingman took advantage of. Getting into the formation both made head on attacks and were each credited with the destruction of a B-17. Overall 5 B-17s were lost on the mission, one due to a mid-air collision with a Fw 190, but of the 8 aircraft Jabs' gruppe put up, all 8 suffered significant damage. In battles against the 8th Air Force, losses in the night fighter force among Bf 110s mounted quickly. The special skills of the night fighters took considerable time to develop. Night fighter commanders and crews resented being sent on these missions, and felt it extremely wasteful. In two months the night fighters finally were withdrawn from the day battle.

To improve his destructive power Jabs had his aircraft's forward armament replaced, changing from the two 20 mm cannons and four MG 17 machine-guns to a pair of 30 mm cannons. The heavier gun was more effective against Allied heavy bombers. He was credited with 3 bombers on the night of 19 February. He added another score in April 1943, bringing his total to 28.

Jabs had a second armament modification made a few months later. Night fighter pilots had been asked to identify their targets before firing upon them to reduce friendly fire accidents. To their surprise, the night fighter pilots discovered they could fly below a heavy British bomber and remain out of sight and undetected. Soon pilots were asking for upward firing guns to be mounted in their aircraft. These modifications were largely done in the field. Jabs had a pair of upward firing 20 mm cannons mounted to his Bf 110. If he could locate the bomber he would approach from below, matching the weaving movement of the bomber. With the target confirmed Jabs would fire from below, aiming for the fuel cells in the right wing root between the fuselage and the inboard engine. This gun mounting they called Schräge Musik or slanting music. The bombers shot down in this manner never saw their attacker. Its use remained unknown to Bomber Command for over a year. It was soon the preferred method of attack. Jabs scored 7 kills in June, bringing his total to 35. By the end of August he had reached 40. On 31 August 1943, he was awarded the German Cross in Gold.

From the fall of 1943 through the spring of 1944 the battle for the night skies over Germany swung to the night fighters. Harris hoped to end the war by destroying Berlin. It was his last opportunity to do so before the Allied land forces would intervene in what could be a very costly land battle. Throughout that winter Harris attempted to win the Battle of Berlin. During this period Jabs was frustrated with his inability to locate and track any bombers, and he reported no victories during this time. The Nuremberg raid on 30/31 March 1944 was the last mission flown in the battle for Berlin. On 1 April Bomber Command was placed under the control of Eisenhower and SHAEF, and the force was turned to France to begin air preparations for the invasion.

On 1 March 1944 Jabs was made the Geschwaderkommodore of NJG 1, replacing Werner Streib, who had been made Inspector of Night Fighters. Three weeks later, on 24 March 1944, Jabs was awarded the Knight's Cross of the Iron Cross with Oak Leaves. The presentation was made by Adolf Hitler at the Berghof, Hitler's residence in the Obersalzberg of the Bavarian Alps, on 4 April 1944. Among others, also present at the award ceremony were Major Kurt Bühligen, Major Bernhard Jope and Major Hansgeorg Bätcher.

On 29 April 1944 Jabs paid a visit to fellow night fighter pilot Heinz-Wolfgang Schnaufer and his Gruppe at St. Trond Belgium. In mid-afternoon through cloudy and foggy skies Jabs made the short trip back to his home base at Deelen. As Jabs approached Deelen he could see a small group of single engine fighters low over the airfield, which he took to be German. The aircraft, in fact, were from No. 132 Squadron RAF, led by Squadron Leader Geoffrey Page, who had taken a flight of Spitfires on a low level mission looking for enemy aircraft. The approaching twin engine fighter was just what Page was looking for. As Jabs continued his approach he saw the aircraft turn toward him. Realizing his mistake, he flew toward his attackers and through some cloud. Emerging on the other side he found himself approaching head on with the Spitfire of New Zealander John Caulton. As the two aircraft rapidly closed both began firing, but Jabs' twin 30 mm cannon took effect first, ripping open the Spitfire's drop tank and putting hits on the engine and wing. Flying past, the undamaged Spitfires regrouped and turned to make another attack. Jabs attempted to reach the cover of his airfield. As the Spitfires closed from behind, Jabs surprised them by turning back into them again. Both sides were firing as they closed. For a brief moment one of the Spitfires was caught by the heavy forward guns of the Bf 110. It was engulfed in fire and crashed to earth. Jabs' aircraft had also taken several hits, and was losing power in one of the engines. He made an abrupt hard landing, and with the aircraft still rolling he and the crew scrambled for cover while the airfield's Flak batteries attempted to drive off the attackers. Despite the fire from the field's defenses, the Spitfires strafed the Bf 110, setting it ablaze.

As Caulton headed west in his damaged Spitfire a large gash opened on the wing. Soon he found his engine was running rough. He lost oil pressure, and as the engine overheated it soon seized up. Caulton had no choice but to put the aircraft down. He did so in a field about 30 miles away from the airfield at Deelen. Of the other four Spitfires that returned to England, all had suffered damage, either from Jabs or the Flak guns.

After the air battle Jabs drove over to the site of Caulton's crash and inspected the stricken Spitfire. Then he and his crew came to the building where Caulton was being held. The two exchanged greetings, and Jabs, who spoke English, asked "Were you flying the Spitfire?" "Yes" Caulton replied. "Well, I was flying the other." They spoke together for a short time, and Caulton asked Jabs for a small signed note as a mark of their meeting. Jabs did so, adding a brief instruction that Caulton was to be allowed to keep it.

End of the war
Six weeks later the Allied invasion of Europe was a signal of the end of the German night fighter force. Airfields in the Low Countries and France came under increasing air attack, both by day and by night. Shortages of fuel became severe. The toll exacted by Mosquito intruder missions limited the effectiveness of the night fighter as well. The German night fighter force lost 54 aircraft and crews in October 1944, from interdictions and accidents. One such loss was Helmut Lent, who on 5 October was flying his Ju 88G-6 nightfighter from Stade to Nordborchen to meet with Jabs to discuss operational matters. During his landing approach he lost power in his left engine. The left wing stalled and dipped. Lent was unable to avoid high voltage cables and crashed into the ground. All four men aboard subsequently died from their injuries. Jabs served in the honour guard at Lent's funeral.

By October 1944 the fuel crisis was severe enough that only Experten were allowed to fly missions. On 1 November 1944 Jabs was promoted to Oberstleutnant (lieutenant colonel). The last two victories Jabs was credited with against Bomber Command were made on the evening of 20/21 February 1945 when he brought down a pair of Lancasters. Jabs remained the commanding officer of NJG 1 through the end of the war. At the completion of his career he had been credited with 50 victories, 22 of these against day fighters, all achieved while flying the Bf 110.

Life after the war

In May 1945 Jabs was interred as a prisoner of war and held by the British for a year. Upon being released he moved to Westphalia where he developed the Lister agricultural equipment business. He was successful in this work. He also became involved in veterans organizations, and was made vice-president of the Gemeinschaft der Jagdflieger or Association of Armed Forces Airmen, a veteran's organization founded in 1952 by former officers of the Luftwaffe to help fellow officers returning to Germany.

After the war Jabs met a number of his former adversaries, including two from his encounter of 29 April 1944, Geoffrey Page and John Caulton. Jabs met Page in the 1950s at a gathering of former fighter pilots in Munich. The two discussed their encounter and formed a friendship. In the 1960s Kiwi native and former Pilot Officer John Caulton read a book Jabs had contributed to, and was intrigued as to whether this was the same man who had given him the note in Belgium. When his daughter traveled to the UK in 1970, he asked her to see if she could track Jabs down. She was successful, and in 1972 the two former adversaries met, and established a friendship. The friendship was long standing, with Caulton and Jabs meeting regularly every 3 to 4 years until Jabs' death in 2003.

Summary of career

Aerial victory claims
Foreman, Parry and Mathews, authors of Luftwaffe Night Fighter Claims 1939 – 1945, researched the German Federal Archives and found records for 33 nocturnal victory claims. Mathews and Foreman also published Luftwaffe Aces — Biographies and Victory Claims, listing Jabs with 48 claims, including 17 as a Zerstörer pilot and one four-engined bomber in daylight, plus two further unconfirmed claims and two by his air gunner.

Awards
 Iron Cross (1939)
 2nd Class (15 May 1940)
 1st Class (28 May 1940)
 Honour Goblet of the Luftwaffe on 29 March 1943 as Hauptmann and Staffelkapitän
 "Crete" Cuffband (21 May 1943)
 German Cross in Gold on 31 August 1943 as Hauptmann in the 11./Nachtjagdgeschwader 1
 Front Flying Clasp of the Luftwaffe in Gold with Pennant (18 May 1944)
 Knight's Cross of the Iron Cross with Oak Leaves
 Knight's Cross on 1 October 1940 as Oberleutnant and pilot and Staffel officer in the 2./Zerstörergeschwader 76
 430th Oak Leaves on 24 March 1944 as Hauptmann and Gruppenkommandeur of the IV./Nachtjagdgeschwader 1

Promotions

Notes

References

Citations

Bibliography

Further reading
 Drewes, Martin (2002). Sombras da noite. Rio de Janeiro: Adler Editora. .

1917 births
2003 deaths
German World War II flying aces
Luftwaffe pilots
Recipients of the Gold German Cross
Recipients of the Knight's Cross of the Iron Cross with Oak Leaves
Military personnel from Lübeck
Businesspeople from Lübeck
Reich Labour Service members